Lieutenant-General Sir Herbert Taylor Macpherson  (22 January 1827 – 20 October 1886) was a Scottish recipient of the Victoria Cross, the highest and most prestigious award for gallantry in the face of the enemy that can be awarded to British and Commonwealth forces.

Early life
Macpherson, was born at Ardersier, near Fort George in Scotland, the son of an officer in the 78th Highlanders. In 1845 he was commissioned ensign in his father's former regiment. Travelling with the regiment to India, he served in the Persian campaign of 1857 and in the Indian Mutiny the following year.

Victoria Cross
He was 30 years old, and a lieutenant in the 78th Highlanders (later The Seaforth Highlanders) British Army, during the Indian Mutiny when the following deed took place on 25 September 1857 at siege of Lucknow for which he was awarded the VC:

Promoted captain in October 1857, he served at the defence of the Alambagh, and as brigade major during the final capture of Lucknow, where he was wounded. He was also promoted brevet major.

Later career
After the Indian Mutiny, Macpherson transferred to the Indian Army. He served on the North-West Frontier in the Black Mountain campaign of 1868, the Lushai Expedition in 1871–72, and the Jowaki Expedition of 1877. During the Second Anglo-Afghan War he commanded a brigade that advanced up to Khyber Pass in 1878–79 and, during the second phase of the war in 1879–80, a brigade of the Kabul Field Force. For his service in Afghanistan, he was given the local rank of major-general in October 1880, and made a knight commander of the Order of the Bath (KCB) in March 1881.

In July 1882 Macpherson was promoted to lieutenant-general, and given command of the Indian contingent that served in the Egypt campaign, including the battle of Tell El Kebir. For this, he was made a knight commander of the Order of the Star of India (KCSI) in November 1882, and the Turkish Order of the Medjidie, second class.

Returning to India, in March 1886 he became Commander-in-Chief of the Madras Army and, after travelling to Burma to take command during the Third Anglo-Burmese War, he died of fever on the steamer Irrawaddy, on 20 October 1886.

Family
Herbert's father was Col Duncan MacPherson of the 78th Regt, Herbert had 10 siblings, with his elder brother being Maj Gen Sir James Duncan MacPherson KCB, In 1859, he married Maria Eckford, daughter of Lieutenant-general James Eckford, C.B. they had 3 children, 1 daughter and 2 sons, both his sons served as officers in the Army

The medal
Macpherson's awards, including his Victoria Cross, are displayed at the Regimental Museum of Queen's Own Highlanders at Fort George, Inverness-shire, Scotland.

References

External links
 
 Major General Herbert Taylor Macpherson, VC, c.1886 Edward Deanes and Edmund Havell the younger. Portrait at National Army Museum

1827 births
1886 deaths
Knights Commander of the Order of the Bath
Knights Commander of the Order of the Star of India
Recipients of the Order of the Medjidie, 2nd class
Indian Rebellion of 1857 recipients of the Victoria Cross
British Army personnel of the Anglo-Egyptian War
78th Highlanders officers
People from Nairn
British Indian Army generals
Scottish military personnel
British military personnel of the Anglo-Persian War
British military personnel of the Second Anglo-Afghan War
British military personnel of the Third Anglo-Burmese War
Bengal Staff Corps officers
British Army recipients of the Victoria Cross